Cannanore may refer to:

 Kolathunadu (later Chirakkal kingdom)
 Arakkal Kingdom
 Kannur, a city in the Indian state of Kerala
 Kannur district, a district in Kerala state
 Kannur taluk, one among the 5 taluks of Kannur district
 Kannur (Lok Sabha constituency), a parliamentary constituency in India
 Kannur (State Assembly constituency), an assembly constituency in Kerala
 Kannur railway station, a major railway station in Kerala